Carcajou Pass is a mountain pass on the Continental Divide and British Columbia–Alberta boundary at the north end of Mount Robson Provincial Park. On the Alberta side lies the northwestern part of Jasper National Park.  is the French word for "wolverine".

See also
List of mountain passes

References

Canadian Rockies
Jasper National Park
Mountain passes of British Columbia
Mountain passes of Alberta
Robson Valley
Borders of Alberta
Borders of British Columbia